Thierry Despont (born 1948 in Limoges, France) is a French architect and interior designer living and working in New York City.

During the 1980s, he was the associate architect for the restoration of the Statue of Liberty.  He then went on to remodel the Herbert N. Straus House at 9 East 72th Street on Manhatttan's Upper East Side for the billionaire Leslie Wexner of Limited Inc. fame (a home which later gained additional notoriety as the abode of Jeffrey Epstein).

Among the high-profile buildings in Manhattan he has designed the interiors for are 220 Central Park South, 
53W53 (the interiors of the condominiums), and the Woolworth Building,

In the early 2000s, he designed the interiors for Gordon Ramsay's restaurant, the eponymous Gordon Ramsay at Claridge's in London. In 2005 he did alterations to The Promenade restaurant at the Dorchester, including fitting it with a oval leather bar the length of Nelson's Column. Between 2007 and 2010, he renovated the Lambs Club's former clubhouse in New York City into the Chatwal New York hotel.

In 2009, Despont redesigned the two restaurants and the bar Il Pricipe at the Hotel Principe di Savoia in Milan, Italy.

Most recently, he worked on the physical conversion of a section of the Battery Maritime Building in Lower Manhattan, into the 47 suite luxury hotel Casa Cipriani, which opened in late 2021.

References

1948 births
Living people
French architects
Interior designers